Arytrurides is a genus of moths of the family Noctuidae.

Species
Arytrurides inornatus (Walker, 1865)
Arytrurides sordidatus (Leech, 1900)

References
Natural History Museum Lepidoptera genus database

Catocalinae